Marco Nappi (born 13 May 1966), also known as Nippo, is an Italian former professional footballer and current manager, who played as a striker. He was most recently the head coach of Pomigliano.

Playing career
Nappi was born in Rome. After signing with Urbe Tevere in 1982, he went on to play for several other Italian clubs, starting his professional footballing career with A.C. Cesena in 1983, remaining with the club until 1986, also spending two seasons on loan with Ravenna (1984–85, and 1985–86). He moved to Arezzo for a season in 1987, before moving to Genoa in 1988. During his time with Genoa (1988–99), he notably won the 1988–89 Serie B title, helping the club to obtain Serie A promotion, and also winning the 1995–96 Anglo-Italian Cup; he was also sent on loan to various clubs during his time with Genoa: Brescia (1989 and 1994–95), Fiorentina (1989–91), Udinese (1991–92), and SPAL (1992–93). He ended his career in 2006, after a season with U.S.D. Sestri Levante 1919. During his time with Fiorentina, he played alongside Roberto Baggio and also Stefano Borgonovo, helping the club to reach the 1990 UEFA Cup Final, where they were defeated by rivals Juventus. Following his retirement, he worked as a coach.

Style of play
A quick, mobile, and creative forward, with an eye for goal, Nappi was known for his long blond hair, as well as his determination and work-rate on the pitch, and was capable of playing in several offensive positions. A skilful player, he was also known for his control, agility, flair and technical ability, as well as his notable use of tricks and feints to beat opponents when dribbling, such as the sombrero; one of his most famous gestures was his use of the seal dribble, which earned him the nickname foca (seal). His most famous use of the seal dribble came in the first leg of the semi-final of the 1989–90 UEFA Cup, against Werder Bremen; during the match, Nappi picked up the ball in his area and ran 20 metres with the ball bouncing along his forehead along the right flank.

After retirement
Nappi served as a pundit for Telenord following his retirement. A good friend of former footballer and ex-Fiorentina team-mate Stefano Borgonovo, Nappi organised the Genoa–Sampdoria derby "United against ALS" in his honour on 27 March 2009, at the Luigi Ferraris stadium in Genoa, scoring from a penalty.

Coaching career
In 2007, Nappi began a career as a youth coach for Figenpa, a Genoan amateur side. In the summer of 2012, he returned to his former club Savona (with whom he had played from 2002 to 2003) as a coach for the "Allievi Nazionali" youth side, reaching the "finali nazionali" with the youth side. In July 2014, he worked as a coach for Serie D side Comprensorio Montalto, although he resigned from this position at the beginning of 2015.

Honours
Genoa
Serie B: 1988–89
Anglo-Italian Cup: 1995–96

Como
Serie B: 2001–02

Vis Pesaro
Serie C2: 1986–87

Ravenna
Serie D: 1984–85

References

External links
 

1966 births
Living people
Association football forwards
Italian footballers
Serie A players
Serie B players
Serie C players
Serie D players
Vis Pesaro dal 1898 players
Ravenna F.C. players
S.S. Arezzo players
Genoa C.F.C. players
Brescia Calcio players
ACF Fiorentina players
Udinese Calcio players
S.P.A.L. players
Atalanta B.C. players
Ternana Calcio players
Como 1907 players
A.C. Cuneo 1905 players
Carrarese Calcio players
A.C. Cesena players